Márk Tamás (born 28 October 1993) is a Hungarian professional footballer who plays as a centre-back for Liga I club Sepsi OSK.

International career
He made his debut for the Hungary national football team on 8 September 2021 in a World Cup qualifier against Andorra, a 2–1 home victory.

Club statistics

Updated to games played as of 12 March 2023.

Honours
 Videoton 
 Ligakupa runner-up: 2012–13

References

External links
MLSZ 
HLSZ 

1993 births
Living people
Sportspeople from Székesfehérvár
Hungarian footballers
Association football defenders
Fehérvár FC players
Puskás Akadémia FC players
Diósgyőri VTK players
Śląsk Wrocław players
Sepsi OSK Sfântu Gheorghe players
Nemzeti Bajnokság I players
Ekstraklasa players
II liga players
Liga I players
Expatriate footballers in Romania
Hungarian expatriate sportspeople in Romania
Expatriate footballers in Poland
Hungarian expatriate sportspeople in Poland
Hungarian expatriate footballers
Hungary under-21 international footballers
Hungary international footballers